The badminton men's doubles tournament at the 1990 Asian Games in Beijing took place from 2 October to 6 October.

Schedule
All times are China Standard Time (UTC+08:00)

Results
Legend
WO — Won by walkover

Final

Top half

Bottom half

References

Men's doubles